Lichtspielhaus (obsolete German for "cinema"; literally "light-play house") is the second DVD by German Neue Deutsche Härte band Rammstein, released on 1 December 2003. It is a compilation of all their videos until then, and some live performances, commercial advertisements, trailers and makings-of features.

Track listing

Videos 
 "Du riechst so gut"
 "Seemann"
 "Rammstein"
 "Engel"
 "Du hast"
 "Du riechst so gut 98"
 "Stripped"
 "Sonne"
 "Links 2-3-4"
 "Ich will"
 "Mutter"
 "Feuer frei!"

Concert highlights
100 Jahre Rammstein Arena Berlin 1996
Herzeleid
Seemann
Philipshalle Düsseldorf 1997
Spiel mit mir
Rock am Ring Festival 1998
Heirate mich
Du hast
Live aus Berlin Wuhlheide 1998
Sehnsucht (Edited studio recording over live performance)
Big Day Out Festival Sydney 2001
Weißes Fleisch
Asche zu Asche
Velodrom Berlin 2001
Ich will
Links 2 3 4

Making of
Du hast
Du riechst so gut 98
Sonne
Links 2-3-4
Ich will

TV trailers
Achtung Blitzkrieg!
Du hast
Links 2-3-4
Mutter

Certifications

References

Rammstein albums
2003 video albums
German-language albums
2003 live albums
2003 compilation albums
Music video compilation albums
Live video albums
Universal Music Group compilation albums
Universal Music Group live albums
Universal Music Group video albums